Maniampattu Vajjiravelu Muralidaran (born on 16 April 1962) is an Indian Judge. Presently, he is Acting Chief Justice of Manipur High Court. He is former Judge of Madras High Court.

References

Indian judges
1962 births
Living people